The Sonoma Coast AVA is an American Viticultural Area in Sonoma County, California, United States containing more than , mostly along the coastline of the Pacific Ocean.  It extends from San Pablo Bay to the border with Mendocino County.  The appellation is known for its cool climate and high rainfall relative to other parts of Sonoma County. The area has such a broad range of microclimates that petitions have been made to the United States Department of the Treasury Alcohol and Tobacco Tax and Trade Bureau for the creation of sub-AVAs such as the Fort Ross-Seaview AVA which was approved in December 2011.

Geography 
The boundaries of the appellation are defined in the Code of Federal Regulations, Title 27, Section 9.116. The following seven cities are located in, or partly in, the Sonoma Coast AVA:
 Cotati
 portions of Healdsburg
 Rohnert Park
 Petaluma
 portions of Santa Rosa
 Sebastopol
 portions of Sonoma

The Petaluma Gap is also part of the Sonoma Coast AVA.

Wineries 
Loos Family Winery sources grapes from Bohemian Vineyard and other small vineyards in Russian River Valley.

E & J Gallo Winery operates Two Rock Vineyard, a  hillside vineyard near Cotati.

See also 
 Sonoma County wine

References

External links 
 Sonoma County Wine Regions (map)

American Viticultural Areas
American Viticultural Areas of the San Francisco Bay Area
Geography of Sonoma County, California
1987 establishments in California